Westbrook is an extinct town in Pemiscot County, in the U.S. state of Missouri.

The community was named after John Westbrook, the proprietor of a local mill.

References

Ghost towns in Missouri
Former populated places in Pemiscot County, Missouri